The State Border Committee of the Republic of Belarus, GPK manages the international borders of Belarus. Its armed paramilitary force is known as the Border Guard Service, It carries out committee orders and policy. The service covers the borders with Russia, Ukraine, Poland, Lithuania and Latvia.

History
The Border Committee was created by decree of the Supreme Soviet of the Republic of Belarus on September 20, 1991. To manage the border units and subunits, the General Directorate of the Border Troops ( was established by order of the Supreme Soviet on January 15, 1992 under the Council of Ministers. To create a legal basis for their activities, the Supreme Council adopted Law No. 1908-XII “On the State Border of the Republic of Belarus”, and Law No. 1911-XII “On the Border Troops of the Republic of Belarus” on November 4–5, 1992. On August 19, 1993, a law was adopted by the Council of Ministers decree on the official creation of the Border Troops of Belarus. Between 1994 and 1997, the first border units were formed/deployed and agreements were made between Belarus' neighbors on cooperation between the border troops of Belarus and neighboring countries. On 11 January 1997 President Lukashenko signed decree renaming the General Directorate to State Committee of the Border Troops. In a September 2007 decree, President Alexander Lukashenko renamed the Border Troops of Belarus to the Border Service.

On September 18, 2020, the committee announced it had tightened border security with Poland and Lithuania, calling up reserves to patrol the borders although Poland and Lithuania said their borders with Belarus remained open.

After the start of the Belarus–EU border crisis, the leadership of the State Border Committee, including its chairman Lappo, was included in the sanctions lists of the European Union, the United States and Canada on December 2, 2021. Switzerland joined the EU sanctions on December 20.

Tasks
Primary tasks of the State Border Committee include:

 Border policy 
Enhancing border security
 Organization
 Management

The Border Service of Belarus has 14 territorial units under its control.

Structure
 Brest Border Group
 Lida Border Detachment
 Smorgon border group
 Grodno Border Group
 Gomel Border Group
 Pinsk Border Detachment
 Polotsk Border Detachment
 Mozyr Border Detachment
 OPOGK "Minsk"
 Dzerzhinsk Logistics Group
 Communications and Support Team
 Institute of Border Service
 Border Guard Military Hospital

Border Service Institute

The Border Service Institute is the official training service of the GPK and is a higher educational institution in the Republic. The institute was founded in August 1993 in accordance with a Resolution of the Council of Ministers on the basis of the Minsk Higher Military-Political-Arms School.

Leadership

General Directorate of Border Troops of the Republic of Belarus 
 Yevgeny Bocharov (February 19, 1992 - August 30, 1994)
 Vasily Morkovkin (September 26, 1994 - September 4, 1996)
 Alexander Pavlovsky (September 4, 1996 - January 13, 1997)

State Committee of the Border Troops
 Alexander Pavlovsky (January 13, 1997 - April 10, 2007)
 Igor Rachkovsky (April 10, 2007 - September 27, 2007)

State Border Committee 
 Igor Rachkovsky (September 27, 2007 - July 31, 2012)
 Alexander Boechko (August 2, 2012 - November 2, 2013)
 Leonid Maltsev (November 2, 2013 - December 27, 2016)
 Anatoly Lappo (December 27, 2016 – Present)

See also
 Visa policy of Belarus

References

Belarus
Government of Belarus
Government paramilitary forces
Military of Belarus